is a former Japanese football player.

Club statistics

References

External links

1986 births
Living people
Hannan University alumni
Association football people from Wakayama Prefecture
Japanese footballers
J2 League players
Fagiano Okayama players
Association football midfielders